"Texas Size Heartache" is a song written by Zack Turner and Lonnie Wilson, and recorded by American country music singer Joe Diffie. It was released in March 1998 as  the first single from his Greatest Hits compilation album, for which it was one of three newly recorded songs.  It reached a peak of number 4 on the country music charts in mid-1998. The song's b-side, "Poor Me," was also issued as a single later in 1998, reaching number 43 on the same chart.

Critical reception
Deborah Evans Price, of Billboard magazine reviewed the song favorably, calling it an "uptempo tune marked by stellar guitar work and lots of tasty fiddle playing." On Diffie's vocals, she says that he is "in good voice, and though the lyric is lightweight, Diffie's buoyant performance and Cook's inventive production turn the song into a winner."

Music video
The music video was directed by Michael Oblowitz and premiered in early 1998.

Chart positions
"Texas Size Heartache" debuted at number 69 on the U.S. Billboard Hot Country Singles & Tracks for the week of April 4, 1998.

Year-end charts

References

Songs about heartache
1998 singles
1998 songs
Joe Diffie songs
Song recordings produced by Don Cook
Epic Records singles
Songs written by Zack Turner
Songs written by Lonnie Wilson